Players and pairs who neither have high enough rankings nor receive wild cards may participate in a qualifying tournament held one week before the annual Wimbledon Tennis Championships.

Seeds

  Julien Benneteau (qualifying competition, lucky loser)
  Olivier Mutis (second round)
  Lee Hyung-taik (second round)
  Richard Gasquet (qualified)
  Nicolas Mahut (second round)
  Davide Sanguinetti (qualifying competition, lucky loser)
  Jan Hernych (qualified)
  Christophe Rochus (qualified)
  Adrián García (first round, retired)
  Jeff Morrison (first round)
  Alex Bogomolov Jr. (first round)
  Tomáš Zíb (first round)
  Juan Mónaco (withdrew)
  Harel Levy (first round)
  Alexander Peya (qualifying competition, lucky loser)
  Potito Starace (qualifying competition, lucky loser)
  Juan Pablo Guzmán (first round)
  Ivo Heuberger (qualified)
  Alejandro Falla (qualified)
  Paul Goldstein (second round)
  Gilles Müller (first round)
  Glenn Weiner (qualified)
  Jiří Vaněk (second round)
  Dick Norman (first round)
  Stefano Pescosolido (qualifying competition, lucky loser)
  Ricardo Mello (first round)
  Santiago Ventura (second round)
  Guillermo García López (first round)
  Roko Karanušić (second round)
  Robert Kendrick (second round)
  Alessio di Mauro (first round)
  Janko Tipsarević (qualified)

Qualifiers

  Jamie Delgado
  André Sá
  Iván Navarro
  Richard Gasquet
  Ramón Delgado
  Glenn Weiner
  Jan Hernych
  Christophe Rochus
  Alejandro Falla
  Ivo Heuberger
  Daniele Bracciali
  Wang Yeu-tzuoo
  Olivier Patience
  Julian Knowle
  Andy Ram
  Janko Tipsarević

Lucky losers

  Julien Benneteau
  Davide Sanguinetti
  Alexander Peya
  Potito Starace
  Stefano Pescosolido

Qualifying draw

First qualifier

Second qualifier

Third qualifier

Fourth qualifier

Fifth qualifier

Sixth qualifier

Seventh qualifier

Eighth qualifier

Ninth qualifier

Tenth qualifier

Eleventh qualifier

Twelfth qualifier

Thirteenth qualifier

Fourteenth qualifier

Fifteenth qualifier

Sixteenth qualifier

External links

 2004 Wimbledon Championships – Men's draws and results at the International Tennis Federation

Men's Singles Qualifying
Wimbledon Championship by year – Men's singles qualifying